Allan Leggat Craig (7 February 1904 – 1984) was a Scottish footballer who played as a centre half for Motherwell, Chelsea and Scotland.

Career

Club
Craig played junior football for Saltcoats Victoria until he signed for Motherwell in 1924. He was a key part of the side that won the Scottish league championship in the 1931–32 season, having also played in the 1931 Scottish Cup Final which Motherwell lost to Celtic after a replay, Craig scoring an unfortunate last-minute own goal in the first match (this was said to have resulted from a mistake in communication: a teammate shouted for 'Allan' to claim a cross ball and both he and goalkeeper Allan McClory did so, with the ball ending up in the net).

He moved to Chelsea in 1933 and played for the West London club until the outbreak of the Second World War in 1939, making 211 appearances in the Football League and FA Cup.

International 
Craig represented Scotland three times, twice in a 1929 tour and once in 1932. He also appeared twice for the Scottish Football League XI.

References

1904 births
1984 deaths
Footballers from Paisley, Renfrewshire
Scottish footballers
Association football central defenders
Saltcoats Victoria F.C. players
Motherwell F.C. players
Chelsea F.C. players
Scottish Football League players
Scottish Junior Football Association players
English Football League players
Scotland international footballers
Scottish Football League representative players